Weinmannia ouaiemensis is a species of plant in the family Cunoniaceae. It is endemic to New Caledonia.

References

ouaiemensis
Endemic flora of New Caledonia
Taxonomy articles created by Polbot